Wittels is a surname.

Notable persons with the name Wittels include:

Fritz Wittels (1880–1950), Austrian-born American psychoanalyst
Garrett Wittels (born 1990), American professional baseball player
Harris Wittels (1984–2015), American actor, comedian, writer, and musician
Stephanie Wittels (born 1981), American voice actress